Kapooka is a closed railway station on the Main South railway line in New South Wales, Australia. The station opened in 1927 and closed in 1975. Its main role was as a signaling facility for a well used passing loop. Neither the station or the passing loop survive today.

References

Disused regional railway stations in New South Wales
Railway stations in Australia opened in 1927
Railway stations closed in 1975
Main Southern railway line, New South Wales